The list of historic places in  the province of Nova Scotia contains heritage sites listed on the Canadian Register of Historic Places (CRHP), all of which are designated as historic places either locally, provincially, federally or by more than one level of government.

The list has been divided by county and regional municipality boundaries for reasons of length.  See separate lists for the following geographic divisions:
Cape Breton Regional Municipality
Halifax Regional Municipality
Region of Queens Municipality
Annapolis County
Antigonish County
Colchester County
Cumberland County
Digby County
Guysborough County
Hants County
Inverness County
Kings County
Lunenburg County
Pictou County
Richmond County
Shelburne County
Victoria County
Yarmouth County

See also 

 List of National Historic Sites of Canada in Nova Scotia
 Heritage Property Act (Nova Scotia)